Resava School, was founded in 1407 by Serbian despot Stefan Lazarević. Based on his endowment, the Manasija monastery, it was called Bašta znanja or the bastion of knowledge for learning, transcribing, translating and illuminating manuscripts in the Serbian Despotate. One of the main supporters of the Resava school was Constantine the Philosopher (Константин Филозоф), also known as Constantine of Kostenets. The canon of this school was followed in monasteries of Hilandar, Patriarchate of Peć, Visoki Dečani and Ljubostinja, and its influences were present in Russia, Bulgaria, Macedonia, and Romania. Monastery of Manasija, also called Resava, had a library of more than 20,000 books.

See also
 Gabriel the Hilandarian
 Gregory Tsamblak
 Isaija the Monk
 Venedikt Crepović

15th-century establishments in Serbia
Medieval Serbian literature